USS Beaverhead (AK-161) was an  commissioned by the U.S. Navy for service in World War II. She was responsible for delivering troops, goods and equipment to locations in the war zone.

Service history
Beaverhead was laid down on 15 June 1944 at Richmond, California, by Kaiser Cargo, Inc., under a Maritime Commission contract, MC hull 2106; launched on 2 September 1944; sponsored by Mrs. T. H. Purdom, Jr.; and commissioned on 3 January 1945. Beaverhead was fitted out at the Naval Supply Depot at Oakland, California, and then underwent a brief conversion at the Naval Sea Frontier Base, Treasure Island, California. Beaverhead departed the San Francisco Bay area on 22 January bound for San Pedro, Los Angeles, and shakedown. At the conclusion of that training, she conducted a post shakedown availability at the San Pedro Harbor Boat Co. between 8 and 14 February.

On the 20th, the ship got underway from San Pedro bound for the Admiralty Islands. She arrived at Manus on 15 March but remained only until the 18th, moving via Hollandia in New Guinea to the Philippine Islands. She arrived in Leyte Gulf on 28 March. Over the next eight months, Beaverhead plied the waters of the Philippines, supplying various American bases. Although operating principally in that archipelago, the ship on occasion, voyaged to Borneo, Morotai, and Manus. Ultimately, Beaverhead sailed for home on 5 December. She transited the Panama Canal on 19 January 1946 and arrived in New York 11 days later. She moved to Norfolk, Virginia, during the second week in February and was decommissioned there on 8 March 1946. The ship was turned over to the Maritime Commission for disposal on 13 March 1946, and her name was struck from the Navy list on 28 March 1946. She was subsequently sold in February 1947.

Beaverhead was sold to the Dutch shipping firm of Koninklijke Nederlandsche Stoomboot Maatschappij, N.V., on 28 March 1947, for $693,862, and renamed Hera. In 1963 she was sold to Bahamas Line, Panama, and renamed Omar Express. She was converted in 1967, to a self-unloading cement carrier, at the Avondale Shipyard, in Avondale, Louisiana, and renamed Cementos Ponce. In 1976 she was renamed Vanessa. She was finally scrapped at Veracruz, Mexico, sometime between 1982 and 1984.

Military awards and honors 
Beaverheadss crew was eligible for the following medals and campaign ribbons:
 American Campaign Medal
 Asiatic-Pacific Campaign Medal
 World War II Victory Medal

Notes

Bibliography

External links

Alamosa-class cargo ships
Beaverhead County, Montana
Ships built in Richmond, California
1944 ships
World War II auxiliary ships of the United States